This is a list of conflicts in Egypt arranged chronologically from ancient to modern times. This list includes nationwide and international wars, including: wars of independence, liberation wars, colonial wars, undeclared wars, proxy wars, territorial disputes, and world wars. Also listed might be any battle that occurred within the territory of what is today known as "Egypt" but was itself only part of an operation of a campaign in a theater of a war. There may also be periods of violent civil unrest listed, such as: riots, shootouts, spree killings, massacres, terrorist attacks, and civil wars. The list might also contain episodes of: human sacrifice, mass suicide, massacres, and genocides.

Prehistoric times

Prehistoric Egypt
 between 14340 to 13140 BCE Battle at Cemetery 117

Ancient times

Early Dynastic Period of Egypt

 c. 3100 BCE Unification of Upper and Lower Egypt
 c. 3050 BCE Hor-Aha, the second pharaoh of Egypt, led a campaign against the Nubians.
 c. 2890 BCE After the death of Qa'a, the last pharaoh of the First Dynasty of Egypt, a short war may have occurred for the throne of Egypt, ending with the accession of Hotepsekhemwy.
 c. 2690 BCE Khasekhemwy reunited Upper Egypt and Lower Egypt after a short period of political fragmentation.

Old Kingdom of Egypt
 c. 2670 BCE Djoser, the first pharaoh of the Third Dynasty of Egypt, dispatched several military expeditions to the Sinai Peninsula, during which the local inhabitants were subdued

First Intermediate Period of Egypt
 c. 2150 BCE The 4.2 kiloyear event triggered famines, social disorder, and fragmentation.
 c. 2140 BCE During the reign of the pharaoh Neferkare III, the nomarch of Hieraconopolis Ankhtifi, led a coalition of his nome and Edfu against Thebes.
 c. 2120 BCE Mentuhotep I and Sehertawy Intef I, independent rulers at Thebes in the early eleventh dynasty of Egypt, had soldiers fighting the Coptite nomarch Tjauti, and the subsequent defeat of Tjauti ultimately put Koptos, Dendera and the three nomes of Hierakonpolis under Theban control, expanding the Theban kingdom 250 km northward with a border near Abydos.
 c. 2075 BCE The pharaoh Akhtoy Nebkaure sacked Thinis

Middle Kingdom of Egypt
 c. 2061 BCE – c. 2010  BCE Campaigns of Mentuhotep II
 c. 1900 BCE, in year 18 of Senusret I conquest of Lower Nubian
 c. 1880 BCE, Amenemhat II, looting of two  cities in Asia
 c. 1860-1850 BCE, Senusret III, four campaigns to Nubia, one campaign to the Southern Levant
 c. =1850 BCE Amenemhat III, short Nubian campaign in year 9 of the king's reign
 c. 1705 BCE – c. 1648 BCE After the death of the sixth pharaoh of the Fourteenth Dynasty of Egypt Nehesy Aasehre, the 14th dynasty continued to rule in the Nile River Delta region of Lower Egypt with a number of ephemeral or short-lived rulers until 1650 BCE when the Hyksos Fifteenth Dynasty of Egypt conquered the Delta.

Second Intermediate Period of Egypt
 c. 1705 BCE – c. 1648 BCE After the death of the sixth pharaoh of the Fourteenth Dynasty of Egypt Nehesy Aasehre, the 14th dynasty continued to rule in the Nile River Delta region of Lower Egypt with a number of ephemeral or short-lived rulers until 1650 BCE when the Hyksos Fifteenth Dynasty of Egypt conquered the Delta.
 c. 1649 BCE the Hyksos conquer Memphis, putting an end to the 13th Dynasty.
 c. 1649 BCE – c. 1600 BCE the Hyksos progress south conquering Middle Egypt, then controlled by the Abydos Dynasty or the 16th Dynasty.
 c. 1629 BCE – c. 1628 BCE Neferhotep III certainly embroiled in a defensive war against the Hyksos Fifteenth Dynasty of Egypt, which would ultimately overrun the Sixteenth Dynasty of Egypt state.
 c. 1582 BCE Final Theban offensive of Hyksos who conquer Thebes ending the 16th Dynasty.
 c. 1580 BCE The Hyksos had withdrawn from Thebes abandoning it to the Seventeenth Dynasty of Egypt.
 c. 1560 BCE – c. 1540 BCE The Seventeenth Dynasty of Egypt at war with the Hyksos.

New Kingdom of Egypt
 c. 1550 BCE Pharaoh Ahmosis I launches an invasion on the Hyksos in Upper and Lower Egypt, driving them out and chasing them into the Levant until his armies obliterated them. Starting a new era in Ancient Egyptian history known as the New Kingdom under the rule of the 18th dynasty. 
 1457 BCE Battle of Megiddo: Thutmose III defeats Canaanite Coalition

 c. 1282 BCE Seti's military campaigns
 1206 BCE – c. 1150 BCE Bronze Age collapse causes the collapse of the New Kingdom of Egypt and subsequent attacks from Libyans, with associated people of Ekwesh, Shekelesh, Lukka, Shardana and Tursha or Teresh possibly Troas. A second attack during the reign of Ramesses III involved Peleset, Tjeker, Shardana and Denyen.
 c. 1178 Egyptian-Sea People wars
 c. 1178 BCE Battle of the Delta
 c. 1178 BCE Battle of Djahy

Third Intermediate Period of Egypt
 925 BCE Battle of Bitter Lakes
 752–721 BCE Conquest of Egypt
 671 BCE Assyrian invasion of Egypt led by Esarhaddon
 664 BCE Sack of Thebes led by Ashurbanipal

Late Period of Egypt

 530–522 BCE Campaigns of King Cambyses II of Persia
 525 BCE Battle of Pelusium
 522–520 BCE Rebellion of Petubastis III
 480s BCE Rebellion of Psamtik IV
 460–454 BCE Rebellion of Inaros II
 459 BCE Battle of Papremis
 411 BCE Amyrtaeus revolted against Darius II of the Achaemenid Empire, leading a guerrilla action in the western Nile Delta around his home city of Sais, and regaining the Egyptian independence.
 385–383 BCE – A Persian invasion of Egypt was repelled by king Hakor
 374–373 BCE – A Persian invasion of Egypt was repelled by king Nectanebo I
 c. 340 BCE – Second Achaemenid conquest of Egypt
 335 BCE – 323 BCE Wars of Alexander the Great
 333 BCE Pelusium opened its gates to Alexander the Great, who placed a garrison in it under the command of one of those officers entitled Companions of the King

Ptolemaic Kingdom of Egypt
 335–323 BCE Wars of Alexander the Great
 333 BCE Pelusium opened its gates to Alexander the Great, who placed a garrison in it under the command of one of those officers entitled Companions of the King
 173 BCE Antiochus Epiphanes utterly defeated the troops of Ptolemy Philometor under the walls of Pelusium, which he took and retained after he had retired from the rest of Egypt
 55 BCE Again belonging to Egypt, Mark Antony, as cavalry general to the Roman proconsul Gabinius, defeated the Egyptian army, and made himself master of the city.
 10 January 49 BCE – 17 March 45 BCE Caesar's Civil War
 48–47 BCE Siege of Alexandria
 47 BCE Battle of the Nile
 32 BCE – August 30 BCE Final War of the Roman Republic
 31 July – 1 August 30 BCE Battle of Alexandria

Roman Province of Egypt

 32 BCE – 30 August BCE Final War of the Roman Republic
 31 July – 1 August 30 BCE Battle of Alexandria
 115–117 CE Kitos War
 172-173 CE Bucolic War
 260-262 CE Gallienus usurpers
 260-261 CE Revolt of the Macriani
 261-262 CE Usurpation of Mussius Aemilianus 
 262 CE Usurpation of Memor
 270–272 CE  Palmyrene War
 270 CE Palmyrene invasion of Egypt
 270 CE Tenagino Probus’ Egyptian campaign
 272 CE Aurelian’s reconquest of Egypt
 273 CE Revolt of Firmus
 279–280 CE Probus’ Blemmyan War
 292–293 CE Busiris–Coptos revolt
 297-298 CE  Usurpation of Domitius Domitianus and Achilleus

Medieval period

Byzantine Diocese of Egypt
 618–621 CE Sassanid conquest of Egypt
 619 CE Siege of Alexandria

Sassanid Empire
 618–621 CE Sassanid conquest of Egypt
 619 CE Siege of Alexandria

Rashidun Caliphate

 639–642 CE Muslim conquest of Egypt
 6 July 640 CE Battle of Heliopolis
 641 CE Siege of Alexandria
 646 CE Battle of Nikiou

Abbasid Caliphate
 809–827 CE Great Abbasid Civil War

Ayyubid dynasty
 1171–1172 CE Ayyubids Conquest of North Africa and Nubia
 1095–1272 CE The Crusades
 1213–1221 CE Fifth Crusade
 1218–1219 CE Siege of Damietta
 1248–1254 CE Seventh Crusade
 6 June 1249 CE Siege of Damietta
 8 February 1250 CE – 11 February 1250 CE Battle of Al Mansurah
 6 April 1250 CE Battle of Fariskur

Mamluk Sultanate of Egypt
 9–12 October 1365 CE Alexandrian Crusade

Modern Times

Eyalet of Egypt

 538–1557 CE Ottoman–Portuguese conflicts
 20 April 1792 – 25 March 1802 CE French Revolutionary Wars
 May–December 1798 CE Mediterranean campaign
 1798–1801 CE French campaign in Egypt and Syria
 13 July 1798 CE Battle of Shubra Khit
 21 July 1798 CE Battle of the Pyramids
 1–3 August 3, 1798 CE Battle of the Nile
 21 October 1798 CE Revolt of Cairo
 25 July 1799 CE Battle of Abukir
 19 February 1799 CE Siege of El Arish
 20 March 1800 CE Battle of Heliopolis
 8 March 1801 CE Battle of Abukir
 13 March 1801 CE Battle of Mandora
 21 March 1801 CE Battle of Alexandria
 17 August – 2 September 1801 CE Siege of Alexandria
 18 May 1803 CE – 20 November 1815 CE Napoleonic Wars
 1807–1809 CE Anglo-Turkish War
 1807 CE Alexandria expedition

Khedivate of Egypt
 1882 CE Anglo-Egyptian War
 11–13 July 1882 CE Bombardment of Alexandria
 June–July 1882 CE Egyptian Expedition
 1882 CE Battle of Kassassin
 1882 CE Battle of Kafr el-Dawwar
 13 September 1882 CE Battle of Tel al-Kebir
 1881–1899 CE Mahdist War
 3 August 1889 CE Battle of Toski

Sultanate of Egypt
 28 July 1914 CE – 11 November 1918 CE World War I
 29 October 1914 CE – 30 October 1918 CE Middle Eastern theatre of World War I
 28 January 1915 CE – 30 October 1918 CE Sinai and Palestine Campaign
 26 January – 4 February 1915 CE Raid on the Suez Canal
 23 April 1916 CE Battle of Katia
 3–August 5, 1916 CE Battle of Romani
 23 December 1916 CE Battle of Magdhaba
 9 January 1917 CE Battle of Rafa
 13–21 February 1917 CE Raid on Nekhl

Kingdom of Egypt

 1 September 1939 CE – 2 September 1945 CE World War II
 10 June 1940 CE – 2 May 1945 CE Mediterranean and Middle East theatre of World War II
 10 June 1940 CE – 13 May 1943 CE North African Campaign
 11 June 1940 CE – 4 February 1943 CE Western Desert Campaign
 9–16 September 1940 CE Italian invasion of Egypt
 9 December 1940 CE – 9 February 1941 CE Operation Compass
 4 February 1942 CE – Abdeen Palace Incident
 1–27 July 1942 CE First Battle of El Alamein
 30 August – 5 September 1942 CE Battle of Alam Halfa
 11 October – 23 November 1942 CE Second Battle of El Alamein
 15 May 1948 CE – 10 March 1949 CE Arab–Israeli War
 December 1948 CE – January 1949 CE Battles of the Sinai

Republic of Egypt
 23 July 1952 CE Egyptian Revolution
 2–3 November, 1955 CE Operation Volcano (Israeli raid)
 29 October – November 7, 1956 CE Suez Crisis
 October 1956 CE Operation Musketeer
 1956 CE Operation Telescope
 1956 CE Battle of Suez (1956)

United Arab Republic
 28 September 1961 CE Collapse of the United Arab Republic

Arab Republic of Egypt
 5–11 June 1967 CE Six-Day War
 5–6 June 1967 CE Battle of Abu-Ageila
 8 June 8, 1967 CE – USS Liberty incident
 1 July 1967 CE – 7 August 1970 CE War of Attrition
 11 July 1967 CE Battle of Rumani Coast
 19 July 1969 CE Operation Bulmus 6
 20 July 1969 CE – 28 July 1969 CE Operation Boxer
 26–27 December 1969 CE Operation Rooster 53
 7 January – 13 April 1970 CE Operation Priha
 22 January 1970 CE Operation Rhodes
 30 July 1970 CE Operation Rimon 20
 6–25 October 1973 CE Yom Kippur War

 6–8 October 1973 Operation Badr
 6 October 1973 Battles of Fort Budapest
 6 October 1973 Battle of Fort Lahtzanit
 6 October 1973 Ofira Air Battle
 6-7 October 1973 Battle of El Qantarah
 7 October 1973 Romani ambush
 7 October 1973 Battle of Marsa Talamat
 7 October 1973 Operation Tagar
 7-8 October 1973 Battle of the Moses Eyes Fortress
 8 October 1973 Battle of Firdan 
 8–9 October 1973 Battle of Baltim
 14 October 1973 Battle of the Sinai
 14 October 1973 Air Battle of El Mansoura
 15 October 1973 – 17 October 1973 Battle of the Chinese Farm
 16 October 1973 Raid on Egyptian missile bases
 17 October 1973 Egyptian 25th Brigade ambush
 18 October 1973 – October 1973 Battle of Ismailia
 22 October 1973 Scud missile attack
 24 October 1973 – 25 October 1973 Battle of Suez
 21–24 July 1977 Libyan-Egyptian War
 25 January 2011 2011 Egyptian Revolution and Aftermath
 25 January – 11 February 2011 Egyptian Revolution
 23 February 2011 – ongoing Sinai insurgency
 22 November 2012 – 3 July 2013 Egyptian protests
 28 June – 3 July 2, 2013 June 2013 Egyptian protests
 3 July 2013 Political violence in Egypt
 16 February 2015 – ongoing Intervention in Libya
 25 March 2015 – ongoing Intervention in Yemen

See also
 List of wars involving Egypt
 Military of ancient Egypt
 Egyptian Army
 Egyptian Navy
 Egyptian Air Force
 Egyptian Air Defense Forces
 Military history of Africa
 African military systems up until the year 1800 CE
 African military systems between the years 1800 CE and 1900 CE
 African military systems after the year 1900 CE

References

Battles involving Egypt
Military history of Egypt
Conflicts